Reginald Flewin (28 November 1920 – 24 May 2008) was an English footballer who played as a central defender for his hometown club Portsmouth.

Flewin signed a professional contract with Pompey on his 17th birthday in 1937, and made his senior debut for the club against Grimsby Town in April 1939. Following the outbreak of World War II, Flewin's football career came to a halt. He served in the Royal Marines during hostilities, and occasionally turned out for Portsmouth in wartime football, winning an England wartime cap against Wales on 16 September 1944.

When football resumed at the end of the war, Flewin became a regular in Portsmouth's defence, and was also named the team's captain. He was a member of the Pompey sides that won consecutive league titles in 1948–49 and 1949–50. Flewin retired in 1953, having played 163 first-team matches for Portsmouth. In 1949 his Portsmouth side was tipped to become the first team to win the double but lost to Leicester City at Highbury. If Portsmouth won the Double he would have been the first skipper since John Devey to win it.

Following his playing career, Flewin moved into coaching, first taking charge of Pompey's youth team, and later became assistant to manager Eddie Lever. He remained assistant manager at Portsmouth until October 1960, when he accepted the job as manager of Stockport County. In September 1963, he moved back south to become manager at Bournemouth, where he spent two years before resigning in 1965.

After leaving football, Flewin settled on the Isle of Wight, where he managed the Fort Warden holiday camp in Totland Bay. He died in May 2008, aged 87 a week after the 2008 FA Cup Final.

References

External links
The Independent: Reg Flewin obituary
Portsmouth News: Pompey mourn death of legend Flewin

1920 births
2008 deaths
English footballers
English football managers
Portsmouth F.C. players
Stockport County F.C. managers
AFC Bournemouth managers
England wartime international footballers
Royal Marines personnel of World War II
Footballers from Portsmouth
Association football central defenders
Military personnel from Portsmouth
Royal Marines ranks